José de Jesús is a given name and also a full name, and may refer to:

José Corazón de Jesús (1896-1932), Filipino poet and song lyricist in the Tagalog language
Jose de Jesus, Filipino politician, Secretary of the Department of Transportation and Communications 2010-2011 under President Benigno Aquino III
José de Jesús (athlete), a Puerto Rican long-distance runner, competed in the marathon at the 1976 Summer Olympics
José de Jesús (athlete), Mexican runner, bronze in half-marathon at 2001 Central American and Caribbean Championships in Athletics
José de Jesús (boxer), "Cagüitas", Puerto Rican boxer and light flyweight champion 
José DeJesús, Puerto Rican baseball pitcher for the Kansas City Royals
José de Jesús (cyclist), Vuelta a Tenerife